Ferdinand of Bavaria (6 October 1577 – 13 September 1650) was Prince-elector archbishop of the Archbishopric of Cologne (Holy Roman Empire) from 1612 to 1650, as successor of Ernest of Bavaria. He was also prince-bishop of Hildesheim, Liège, Münster, and Paderborn.

Biography
Ferdinand was born in Munich, one of the sons of William V, Duke of Bavaria and Renata of Lorraine, a daughter of Francis I, Duke of Lorraine and granddaughter of Christian II of Denmark. He may have been named in honor of his paternal great-grandfather, Ferdinand I, Holy Roman Emperor.

His parents decided early that he would have church life, and they sent him to the Jesuit College of Ingolstadt for education in early 1587. He quickly became a canon in Mainz, Cologne, Würzburg, Trier, Salzburg, and Passau. In 1595 he became Prince-Provost of Berchtesgaden and the coadjutor of his uncle Ernest of Bavaria. His uncle retired from most duties associated with his office, leaving Ferdinand to run the many lands he ruled. When Ernest died in 1612, Ferdinand was elected the Archbishop-Elector of Cologne and the Prince-Bishop of Liège, Hildesheim, Münster, and, from 1618, Paderborn. Ferdinand never received ordination, exercising princely rule but appointing auxiliary bishops to carry out his religious duties.

Ferdinand worked hard throughout his reign to promote Catholicism in his lands. He pushed reforms and adoption of the Council of Trent's objectives, and improved the position of the Wittelsbachs in Germany. In 1612 he attempted to get his brother Duke Maximilian I of Bavaria elected the Holy Roman Emperor, although Maximilian rejected the crown.

In 1618 the Thirty Years' War broke out. Ferdinand had initial success in supporting the Catholic leaders and keeping his dioceses safe from war with Spanish aid, although these lands were devastated after Sweden entered the war. By the end of the war, Swedish, Spanish, French and Imperial armies had all fought in and raided the bishoprics. In 1642 Ferdinand appointed his nephew Maximilian Henry coadjutor and he retired from most of the temporal affairs of the dioceses.

In the period of the persecution of witches (1435 – 1655) 37 people were executed in Cologne, mostly during Ferdinand's reign as Archbishop of Cologne. The most famous victim of his witch-hunt was Katharina Henot.

Ferdinand died in 1650 in the ducal Westphalian capital Arnsberg and was buried in Cologne Cathedral. He was succeeded by Maximilian Henry of Bavaria.

Ancestors

References

1577 births
1650 deaths
Nobility from Munich
People from the Duchy of Bavaria
Ferdinand of Bavaria
Archbishop-Electors of Cologne
Prince-Bishops of Paderborn
17th-century Roman Catholic archbishops in the Holy Roman Empire
Burials at Cologne Cathedral
Prince-Bishops of Liège
Prince-Bishops of Münster
Roman Catholic bishops of Hildesheim
Abbots of Stavelot
Clergy from Munich
Sons of monarchs